Van-Dave Gbowea Harmon (born 22 September 1995) is a Liberian footballer who plays as a forward for Kosovan club Ballkani and the Liberia national team.

Career

After playing for Liberian club Barrack Young Controllers as well as Diambars in Senegal, Harmon signed for Latvian side FK Metta, before joining 1. SC Znojmo FK in the Czech second division.

In 2019, he signed for Kosovar club KF Drenica. While playing for them, he got a red card during a 1–1 draw with SC Gjilani after reacting to Franc Veliu's racist remarks.

In 2020, Harmon signed for KF Laçi in the Albanian top flight.

References

External links
 Van-Dave Harmon at National Football Teams

1995 births
Living people
Liberian footballers
Liberian expatriate footballers
Association football forwards
Barrack Young Controllers FC players
Diambars FC players
1. SC Znojmo players
KF Drenica players
KF Feronikeli players
KF Laçi players
Latvian Higher League players
Czech National Football League players
Football Superleague of Kosovo players
Kategoria Superiore players
Liberia international footballers
Liberian expatriate sportspeople in the Czech Republic
Liberian expatriate sportspeople in Kosovo
Expatriate footballers in Senegal
Expatriate footballers in Latvia
Expatriate footballers in the Czech Republic
Expatriate footballers in Kosovo
Expatriate footballers in Albania